Nora Connolly is an Irish actress who has been active on screen since the late 1970s.

She has appeared in productions including Grange Hill, BBC2 Playhouse, Only Fools and Horses, Juliet Bravo, The Bill, The Witches and Bramwell.

Filmography

Film

Television

External links

British actresses
Living people
Year of birth missing (living people)